The Women's Tournament of Champions 2015 is the women's edition of the 2015 Tournament of Champions, which is a PSA World Series event (prize money: 118 000 $). The event took place at the Grand Central Terminal in New York City in the United States from 19 January to 23 January. Raneem El Weleily won her first Tournament of Champions trophy, beating Alison Waters in the final.

Prize money and ranking points
For 2015, the prize purse was $118,000. The prize money and points breakdown is as follows:

Seeds

Draw and results

See also
2015 PSA World Tour
Men's Tournament of Champions 2015
Tournament of Champions (squash)

References

External links
WSA Tournament of Champions 2015 website
Tournament of Champions 2015 official website

Women's Tournament of Champions
Women's Tournament of Champions
2015 in women's squash
Tournament of Champions (squash)